There is a notable lack of dental care in rural Alaska. This is likely due to the fact that many Alaska Natives live in rural villages, most of which are only accessible by boat or bush plane. There are many programs to increase awareness of the importance of dental care among Alaska Natives while helping them to receive the professional care and guidance that they need. There are many dental issues that are disproportionately common within the rural Alaska Native population, such as tooth disease. To help with these health issues, there are dentists, as well as dental therapist aides, who travel to these villages to perform care. These programs are mostly funded by the United States federal government and the Alaska Native Corporations.

Oral health

The Alaskan Native population has one of the highest rates of oral disease in the world. Children in this population aged 2 to 5 years have almost five times the amount of tooth decay as children of the same age elsewhere in the United States. Children ages 6 to 14 have 4.5 times the amount, and adults are 2.5 times higher. There are over 200 Native Alaskan Villages, many of which are very remote. Travel to these villages usually requires a boat, airplane, or snow machine, which means the cost of transportation is expensive and prohibits many of the villagers from leaving to get dental care. 

Other factors affecting the population's dental health include the difficulty of obtaining fresh food in remote locations, a lack of running water that contains fluoride to improve dental health, and little access to education on the importance of dental health.

Funding for rural dentistry
As traveling to rural areas of Alaska’s wilderness can be expensive, especially with all of the gear that a dentist requires, there is much funding that goes to this program. The first of this money came from The Snyder Act of 1921. This was the first Act of Congress to appropriate funds to care for the health of the Indian population. The next Act to come was the Indian Health Care Improvement Act of 1976, signed on October 1 by President Gerald R. Ford. this Act would recognize the need for better health care among the Indian population, as their general health registered far below that of the general population of the United States The Improvement Act also appropriated funds for the facilities used for Indian and Alaska Native health care as most of these facilities were far below the quality obtained by other, non-Indian,  health care facilities.

The Indian Self-Determination and Education Assistance Act of 1975 allowed Alaska Native Tribes and Regional Native corporations to contract with certain federal agencies to fund health programs and to allow these entities to deliver health, medical, and educational services to the American Indian and Alaska Native People. These efforts were combined in 1997 when the United States government required a few Alaska Native groups to form a tribal health consortium. This was accomplished with the creation of the Alaska Native Tribal Health Consortium which would manage the distribution of Indian Health Services money, allowing the Alaskan Native community to self-govern their own funds.

Funding for aide program
The Dental Health Aide Therapists Program is sponsored by multiple outlets, among them: The W.K. Kellogg Foundation, Alaska Native regional health organizations- sponsors of the students attending the program, and the United States Government through various Acts of Congress. One specific Act of Congress, the Indian Health Care Improvement Act of 2007, included funds specifically for continuing the Dental Aide program. The Dental Health Aide Program is viewed as vital by delegates who are attempting to keep dental care in the villages of Alaska. Once Dental Health Aides complete their program, they are permitted, under a Federal Agreement, to directly bill Medicaid for services provided.

Scientists from RTI International and the University of North Carolina performed a study in June 2011 to evaluate Alaska's DHAT initiative on behalf of the Alaska Native Tribal Health Consortium. The study found that "Alaska's dental therapists are now providing safe, competent and appropriate care in their scope of practice." According to the study, the DHAT program provided broader access to care and contributed to the local economy, whereas the itinerant dental care system had been failing for fifty years.

Dentists
Unlike a traditional dentist, a dental therapist isn't by technical definitions a true dentist and can work independently of a licensed dentist's supervision. A certified dental therapist in Alaska receives two years of intensive training in a program uniquely suited to the challenges of Alaskan dentistry. After receiving this training, the graduate may perform basic dental work - this includes drilling, administering fillings, and extraction. More complicated procedures, however, such as root canals and more complex extractions, must be referred to a fully trained dentist.

Thus far, the dental therapist program has been quite successful in providing safe, competent care for rural Alaskans. A 2011 study published by the RTI International found that dental therapists are technically competent to do their jobs effectively and safely, that their mission to successfully treat cavities and help relieve pain for people who have extremely limited access to health care has been successful, that patient satisfaction was very high, and that they are a well-accepted institution in tribal villages.

These programs that offer a short period of training and rapid deployment into the field provide the rural Alaska bush with desperately needed health professionals but are not without controversy. The Alaska Dental Association opposes the program, claiming that dental therapists, with their less than substantial training, offer sub-standard care, and have the capability to cause more harm than good with irreversible procedures. The ADA still continues to oppose dental therapists practicing without the supervision of a licensed dentist anywhere in the lower 49 states, and currently, therapists can only operate in Alaska.

Work in the villages
The daily work of the dental therapist is in the rural village – tiny, almost certainly lacking in comfortable amenities, and usually completely cut off from the rest of the world, accessible only by small aircraft and snowmobiles in the winter. Rarely do the size of these villages exceed 750 people, and the populations of some number merely in the dozens.

To practice dentistry here, the dental therapist must fly in both him or her and most of the equipment needed. Not all villages have dedicated clinics where the therapists can work. Instead, once there, the therapist must utilize back rooms, living rooms, stores, and even garages to set up the operation, and, quite often, this area also becomes the therapist's living quarters for the duration of his/her stay in the village. A therapist is lucky if this temporary living space comes equipped with running water or a working septic system – often, more primitive solutions are required. Their stay can often resemble a camping trip, and a therapist is expected to bring his or her own sleeping bag and toiletries.

Once there, the work must be done quickly in order to make sure everyone who needs care receives it before the dental therapist's supplies are exhausted. This often makes for an intense work schedule, and patients are operated on and sent on their way as quickly as possible.

The typical dentist office in a rural village varies slightly from what one would expect from a traditional dental office. In a customary neighborhood dentist’s office, one would expect a clean area devoted solely to the practice of dentistry, however, when dentists travel out to rural villages they are usually given an extra room somewhere in which to practice their trade. Many of these extra rooms are found in a local school or other communal establishments. A traveling dentist would receive some of the random places in which they can care for as many of the villagers as possible in the span of a week or two.  In some of the larger villages, there are offices established and devoted to the health care of the individuals living in and around these specific villages. In such establishments, there are rooms that are to be used to administer the dental care needed. This building is one such building that has been erected to better carry out health care in rural Alaska.

References

Healthcare in Alaska
Dentistry in the United States